360: Three Sixty is a 1999 futuristic racing game for the PlayStation console, released in Europe, and was developed by Smart Dog and published by Cryo Interactive. The game is set in a world submerged beneath water, where hover ships are used for racing and the players use lethal weapons to take down their opponents.

Gameplay 
The player can select from one of eight hover ships, each with differing speed, acceleration, agility and armour ratings. There are a selection of racing circuits flooded with water upon which you race against CPU opponents. Weapons can be fired at opponents either directly in front, or behind after rotating the view to look behind.

There are tournament, time-trial and two player split screen modes.

Reception 
OPM UK called the game "an appalling travesty of a sham of a mockery" and gave a rating of 2 out of 10.

References 

1999 video games
Europe-exclusive video games
PlayStation (console) games
Cryo Interactive games
PlayStation (console)-only games
Science fiction racing games
Video games developed in France
Multiplayer and single-player video games
Cancelled Nintendo 64 games